Raymond J. "Rocco" Calvo (December 15, 1929 – August 12, 1995) was an American football, basketball and baseball coach. He served two stints as the head football coach at Moravian College in Bethlehem, Pennsylvania, from 1955 to 1976 and 1982 to 1986, compiling a record of 122–102–9. Calvo was also the head basketball coach at Moravian from 1957 to 1967, tallying a mark of 118–87, and the school's head baseball coach from 1974 to 1982, amassing a record of 89–85–4.

Head coaching record

Football

References

External links
 

1929 births
1995 deaths
American football quarterbacks
Cornell Big Red football players
Moravian Greyhounds athletic directors
Moravian Greyhounds baseball coaches
Moravian Greyhounds football coaches
Moravian Greyhounds men's basketball coaches
Sportspeople from Bethlehem, Pennsylvania
Players of American football from Pennsylvania
Basketball coaches from Pennsylvania